The Junior League World Series East Region is one of six United States regions that currently sends teams to the World Series in Taylor, Michigan. The region's participation in the JLWS dates back to 1981.

East Region States

Region Champions
As of the 2022 Junior League World Series.

Results by State
As of the 2022 Junior League World Series.

See also
East Region in other Little League divisions
Little League – East 1957-2000
Little League – Mid-Atlantic
Little League – New England
Intermediate League
Senior League
Big League

References

East
Baseball competitions in the United States